Everybody on My Dick Like They Supposed to Be is a mixtape by American singer-songwriter and musician Paul Banks, best known as the frontman of the band Interpol. Self-released by Banks on January 25, 2013 through DatPiff, it was originally intended to be a pre-release bonus for Banks' second solo studio album, Banks (2012).

In contrast to Interpol's rock music sound and Banks's solo work, the mixtape features hip hop tracks and lo-fi hip hop instrumentals, all produced by Banks. It also features guest appearances from rappers El-P, Talib Kweli, High Prizm, and Mike G.

Critical reception

Pitchfork critic Jayson Greene panned the mixtape, writing that none of the tracks from the record "[are] remotely salvageable". Greene also compared the instrumentals to those "on YouTube made by well-meaning college sophomores", concluding that there is "no effort, vision, or craft in this music".

Track listing
 "Rise Like the Sea" – 1:38
 "Best Kill Me" – 0:32
 "Driver" – 0:50
 "Beauty" – 1:30
 "What's in the Box" (featuring Talib Kweli) – 2:14
 "Iron Mike" – 3:18
 "Just Don't Buy It" (demo excerpt) – 0:33
 "Young Again" (demo excerpt) – 0:54
 "It Was a Goal" – 2:01
 "Only a Man (I Work for Dick Jones)" – 3:08
 "Young Again" (demo excerpt pt. II) – 0:19
 "Trace" (featuring High Prizm) – 3:08
 "What's in the Box Reprise" (featuring Mike G) – 2:21
 "Arise, Awake" (demo excerpt) – 1:00
 "Show You My Footage" – 1:47
 "Music from Club Scene – Burma" – 0:50
 "Calgary Palm Springs" – 1:20
 "Denmark (Fetch)" – 2:07
 "Lost Weekend" (Young Again first demo excerpt) – 0:48
 "Quite Enough" (featuring El-P) – 2:06
 "Spank Beat" – 3:27

Personnel
 Paul Banks – production
 Talib Kweli – rapping (5)
 High Prizm – rapping (12)
 Mike G – rapping (13)
 El-P – rapping (20)

References

External links
 Everybody on My Dick Like They Supposed to Be on DatPiff

2013 mixtape albums
Self-released albums
Hip hop albums by American artists
Instrumental hip hop albums
Paul Banks (American musician) albums